Richard Andrew Anderson (born November 19, 1960) is a retired American professional basketball player who played in the National Basketball Association (NBA) and other leagues. A 6'10", . power forward, he played collegiately at University of California, Santa Barbara from 1978 to 1982.

He was selected with the 9th pick in the second round of the 1982 NBA Draft by the San Diego Clippers. His NBA career lasted until 1990; his last season being with the Charlotte Hornets.  Anderson also played in Italy for Pallacanestro Cantù (1984–1986).

In the 1991 offseason he was signed by the Miami Heat, but was waived prior to the 1991–92 season.

Notes

External links
College & NBA stats @ basketballreference.com
Draft profile @ thedraftreview.com

1960 births
Living people
American expatriate basketball people in Italy
American men's basketball players
Charlotte Hornets players
Denver Nuggets players
Houston Rockets players
Pallacanestro Cantù players
Portland Trail Blazers players
Power forwards (basketball)
San Diego Clippers draft picks
San Diego Clippers players
Sioux Falls Skyforce (CBA) players
Basketball players from Los Angeles
UC Santa Barbara Gauchos men's basketball players